Prunus alaica is a species of bush cherry native to Central Asia.

References 

alaica
alaica
Flora of Central Asia